Caicedo de Yuso is a village in Lantarón municipality, Álava, Basque Country, Spain. 

Populated places in Álava